The UCI Para-cycling Track World Championships are the world championships for track cycling where athletes with a physical disability compete, organized by the Union Cycliste Internationale (UCI).

The Championships were earlier administered by the International Paralympic Committee.

The 1994, 1998, 2002  and 2007 IPC World Championships combined track and road events.  The UCI and the IPC organized the 2006 IPC Cycling World Championships. The first UCI Para-cycling World Championships took place in 2007.

The UCI awards a gold medal and a rainbow jersey to the winner and silver and bronze medals to the second and third.

Championships

See also
UCI Track Cycling World Championships
UCI World Championships

References

External links
Union Cycliste Internationale (UCI)

 
Para-cycling Track Cycling World Championships
Track cycling races
Recurring sporting events established in 2007